PPDA may refer to:

People
Patrick Poivre d'Arvor, a French TV journalist and writer nicknamed PPDA

Politics
Dignity and Truth Platform Party,, a Moldovan political party
Democracy at Home Party, a Moldovan political party

Other uses
Public Procurement and Disposal of Public Assets Authority, a parastatal organisation in Uganda